Harshini is a fantasy novel written by Australian author Jennifer Fallon. It is the third in The Demon Child trilogy.

References

External links
Jennifer Fallon's official site

Australian fantasy novels
Novels by Jennifer Fallon
HarperCollins books
2001 Australian novels